The Floridian Social Club (formerly the State Theatre) is a Beaux-Arts style concert venue in St. Petersburg, Florida. The venue closed in 2017 due to local fire code violations. It was purchased in 2018, with renovations beginning that same year. Construction was completed however the site was not able to reopen due to the COVID-19 pandemic. The venue reopened in February 2021.

In 1991, the building was added to The St. Petersburg Register of Historic Places.

History
The original building was constructed as Alexander National Bank in 1924. It was designed by Neel Reid, who also designed the Alexander Hotel in St. Petersburg. At that time, the  building made it one of the largest banks in St. Petersburg. The bank was shut down in 1926 with the death of Jacob Alexander.

During part of 1927, the building was occupied by the Gregory Electric Refrigeration Company but by 1928 sat vacant. The Fidelity Bank and Trust Company purchased the building in July 1929. The stock market crash in October of that same year was too much for the local economy and the Fidelity Bank, like most St. Petersburg banks, was forced to close. After Fidelity's liquidation in 1931, the building was used for a succession of small office tenants until 1949 when it was remodeled by Archie Parrish into the State Theatre.

In November 2016, the building failed a fire inspection, receiving 30 fire code violations from St. Petersburg Fire Rescue. By the end of August, the venue cleared 11 of the violations. In September, the owners hired John A. Bodziak to redesign the space to comply with local fire codes. The venue booked 12 concerts from mid-September to early November.

After an inspection on September 22, 2017, the fire department stated the capacity would have to reduce from 705 to 431. Despite protests from the owners, the City Council approved the occupancy limit. Seven concerts were canceled and moved to different venues, costing The State over $200,000 in lost revenue.

Bodziak redesigned the theater to increase the capacity to 590. Despite changes, the owners place the property on sale in December 2017. The building sold for $2.1 million, purchased by real estate broker Kevin Chadwick. It was set to reopen on September 28, 2018, with a performance by Andy Grammer, however, this did not come to fruition. Instead, Chadwick expanded the renovations for the building.

Construction completed on the site in February 2020, with an increased capacity to 800. In April 2020, Chadwick announced the venue will now be named the "Floridian Social Club". The now re-opened and remodeled venue hosts concerts for local, regional and national musical acts, as well as special events.

Design
The facade of the State Theatre is a symmetrical composition of three bays. The bays are defined by engaged pilasters expressed as a series of quoins above a projected water table base topped by an ionic capital with an attached swag. A projected cornice with a simple entablature tops the facade. Above this is a parapet divided into three corresponding bays again divided by projecting pilasters. Each of the three main bays contains a pair of ionic columns on a block base supporting a banded arch with an engaged keystone with an acanthus motif.

A stylized bas-relief eagle fills the space between the sides of the three arches and the engaged pilasters. The original fenestration was removed at the time of the 1949 remodeling when the openings at the side bays were filled, and a new contemporary projecting marquis was added at the central bay above the theater doors.

Noted performers

They Might Be Giants
Matchbox Twenty
Orchestral Manoeuvres in the Dark (OMD)
Twenty One Pilots
Sum 41
Stephen Stills
Chick Corea
Warren Zevon
Garbage
Tori Amos
Yeah Yeah Yeahs
Betty Who
Shwayze
The Dillinger Escape Plan
Saliva
LANY
Dawes
Less Than Jake
Neon Trees
The Ting Tings
Hoodie Allen
Watsky

References

Buildings and structures in St. Petersburg, Florida
Music venues in Florida
Theatres in Florida
Music venues completed in 1950
Cinemas and movie theaters in Florida
Tourist attractions in St. Petersburg, Florida
1950 establishments in Florida